William James Alexander McKinlay (born 22 April 1969) is a Scottish football manager and former professional footballer who is assistant manager of West Ham United.

As a player, he was a midfielder who notably played in the Premier League for Blackburn Rovers, Leicester City, Bradford City and Fulham. He also played in the Scottish Premiership for Dundee United, the Football League for Preston North End and the Scottish Football League for Clydebank. McKinlay appeared 29 times for Scotland and played at Euro 1996 and the 1998 World Cup.

As a coach, he has worked for Fulham, the Northern Ireland national team and Watford. He was appointed Watford head coach in September 2014 but left the post after eight days. After a spell as assistant head coach with Real Sociedad in Spain, he joined Norwegian club Stabæk in November 2015, before being sacked in July 2016. He has since worked at Sunderland and Stoke City is currently the assistant manager of West Ham United.

Club career
A product of Dundee United's scouting and coaching network in the west of Scotland, Glasgow-born McKinlay was signed from Hamilton Thistle in 1986. He played in the 1988 Scottish Cup Final side at the age of 19, after only twelve Scottish Football League appearances. He went on to play over two hundred matches for United, but missed out on the club's 1994 Scottish Cup win due to suspension.

Following Dundee United's relegation in 1995, McKinlay requested a transfer. He was sold to English Premier League champions Blackburn Rovers in October 1995 for a fee of £1.75 million. After leaving Blackburn in 2000, McKinlay had brief spells with Bradford City, Preston North End and Clydebank. In 2002, he joined Leicester City, scoring his only goal for them against Coventry City. In 2004, Fulham manager Chris Coleman signed McKinlay, primarily to assist the reserve squad.

International career
McKinlay represented Scotland at under-21 and B international level before making his full debut in 1993. He made 14 appearances for Scotland while with Dundee United, the last two as a First Division player. He is one of only three players from that division to play at full international level for Scotland since 1975. In total he played 29 times for Scotland between 1993 and 1998, scoring four goals. He was selected for the Euro 1996 and 1998 World Cup squads, making one appearance at each tournament.

Coaching career

Fulham
On 21 December 2007, Fulham first-team coach Ray Lewington and reserve team manager McKinlay took over after manager Lawrie Sanchez was sacked. Roy Hodgson was appointed nine days later. McKinlay coached Fulham's reserve side and developed youth talent, and in 2012 became Northern Ireland assistant manager, but returned to Fulham to manage the side's 4–0 defeat at Everton, on 28 April 2012 due to Martin Jol's chest infection and was again in charge on Merseyside, for Fulham's win against Liverpool. On 2 December 2013, McKinlay left Fulham after Martin Jol's departure a day earlier.

Watford
McKinlay was appointed as Watford first-team coach, under head coach Óscar Garcia, on 26 September 2014. McKinlay replaced Garcia a few days later as head coach, after the Spaniard resigned due to suffering from ill health. McKinlay relinquished his role as Northern Ireland's assistant manager after becoming the Watford manager. After just eight days in the job, McKinlay was replaced as Watford head coach by Slaviša Jokanović. McKinlay had taken charge of two matches, a win against Brentford and a draw with Brighton.

Real Sociedad
On 27 November 2014, McKinlay joined Spanish club Real Sociedad as an assistant coach, working alongside David Moyes. He was sacked, along with Moyes, on 9 November 2015.

Stabæk
On 30 November 2015, McKinlay was appointed as manager of Norwegian Tippeligaen side Stabæk Fotball on a two-year contract. McKinlay resigned as manager on 8 July 2016, after being knocked out of the Europa League by Connah's Quay Nomads.

Sunderland
McKinlay joined Sunderland as a scout, initially under Moyes, in 2016. In October 2017 he was promoted to a temporary first team coaching role by manager Simon Grayson when assistant manager Glynn Snodin became ill. Following Grayson's sacking, McKinlay and Robbie Stockdale were appointed the club's joint caretaker managers in November 2017. After one game in charge, a 1–0 loss against Middlesbrough on 5 November 2017,

West Ham United
McKinlay left Sunderland to take a coaching position at West Ham United. He left the east London club at the end of the 2017–18 season, after manager David Moyes' contract was not renewed.

Stoke City
McKinlay joined Stoke City on 21 November 2019, as assistant manager to Michael O'Neill. McKinlay left Stoke by Mutual consent on 12 April 2021.

Return to West Ham United
In July 2021, McKinlay rejoined West Ham United as part of David Moyes’ coaching staff.

Career statistics

Scores and results list Scotland's goal tally first, score column indicates score after each McKinlay goal.

Managerial statistics

References

External links
 
 
 Career statistics
Dundee United FC Historical Archive profile

1969 births
1998 FIFA World Cup players
Blackburn Rovers F.C. players
Bradford City A.F.C. players
Clydebank F.C. (1965) players
Dundee United F.C. players
Premier League players
Fulham F.C. non-playing staff
Fulham F.C. players
Leicester City F.C. players
Living people
Footballers from Glasgow
Preston North End F.C. players
Scottish Football League players
Scottish Football League representative players
Scottish football managers
Scottish expatriate football managers
Scottish footballers
Scotland international footballers
Scotland B international footballers
Scotland under-21 international footballers
English Football League managers
English Football League players
UEFA Euro 1996 players
Watford F.C. managers
Watford F.C. non-playing staff
Stabæk Fotball managers
Scottish expatriate sportspeople in Norway
Expatriate football managers in Norway
Association football midfielders
Real Sociedad non-playing staff
Sunderland A.F.C. non-playing staff
West Ham United F.C. non-playing staff
Stoke City F.C. non-playing staff
Scottish expatriate sportspeople in Spain
Association football coaches